Horațiu Victor Lasconi (born 8 April 1963) is a Romanian former footballer who played as a forward and midfielder. In 2016 Lasconi was awarded the Honorary Citizen of Petroșani title.

International career
Horațiu Lasconi played three friendly games at international level for Romania, making his debut in a 2–2 against Poland while playing in the second league for Jiul Petroșani.

Honours
Jiul Petroșani
Divizia B: 1985–86, 1988–89
Steaua București
Divizia A: 1988–89
Cupa României: 1988–89

Notes

References

1963 births
Living people
Romanian footballers
Romania international footballers
Association football forwards
Liga I players
Liga II players
CSM Jiul Petroșani players
CS Minerul Lupeni players
Chimia Râmnicu Vâlcea players
FC Steaua București players
People from Petrila